Hackney is an English medieval surname from the village (now London borough) of Hackney.

Notable persons with the surname Hackney include:

By given name 

 Alan Hackney (1924–2009), British screenwriter
 Clarence Hackney (1894–1941), Scottish-American professional golfer
 Darrell Hackney (born 1983), American football quarterback
 Duane D. Hackney (1947–1993), United States Air Force Pararescueman, who was the most decorated airman in USAF history
 Jeffrey Hackney (born 1941), legal academic and former Fellow of Wadham College, Oxford
 Joe Hackney (born 1945), North Carolina politician
 Keith Hackney (born 1958), retired American martial arts fighter
 Leonard Hackney (1855–1938), Justice of the Indiana Supreme Court
 Mabel Hackney (1872–1914), British actress
 Pearl Hackney (1916–2009), British actress
 Rod Hackney (born 1942), British architect
 Sheldon Hackney (1933–2013), American educator
 Simon Hackney (born 1984), English professional football player
 Thomas Hackney (1861–1946), U.S. Representative from Missouri
 David Hackney (born 1965), representative in the Washington State Legislator

English toponymic surnames